Effectiveness or effectivity is the capability of producing a desired result or the ability to produce desired output. When something is deemed effective, it means it has an intended or expected outcome, or produces a deep, vivid impression.

Etymology
The origin of the word "effective" stems from the Latin word effectīvus, which means creative, productive or effective.  It surfaced in Middle English between 1300 and 1400 A.D.

Usage
In mathematics and logic, effective is used to describe metalogical methods that fit the criteria of an effective procedure.

In group theory, a group element acts effectively (or faithfully) on a point, if that point is not fixed by the action.

In physics, an effective theory is, similar to a phenomenological theory, a framework intended to explain certain (observed) effects without the claim that the theory correctly models the underlying (unobserved) processes.

In heat transfer, effectiveness is a measure of the performance of a heat exchanger when using the NTU method.

In medicine, effectiveness relates to how well a treatment works in practice, especially as shown in pragmatic clinical trials, as opposed to efficacy, which measures how well it works in explanatory clinical trials or research laboratory studies.

In management, effectiveness relates to getting the right things done. Peter Drucker reminds us that "effectiveness can and must be learned".

In human–computer interaction, effectiveness is defined as "the accuracy and completeness of users' tasks while using a system".

In military science, effectiveness is a criterion used to assess changes determined in the target system, in its behavior, capability, or assets, tied to the attainment of an end state, achievement of an objective, or creation of an effect, while combat effectiveness is: "...the readiness of a military unit to engage in combat based on behavioral, operational, and leadership considerations. Combat effectiveness measures the ability of a military force to accomplish its objective and is one component of overall military effectiveness."

Related terms
Efficacy, efficiency, and effectivity are terms that can, in some cases, be interchangeable with the term effectiveness. The word effective is sometimes used in a quantitative way, "being very effective or not very effective". However, neither "effectiveness", nor "effectively", inform about the direction (positive or negative) or gives a comparison to a standard of the given effect.  Efficacy,  on the other hand, is the extent to which a desired effect is achieved; the ability to produce a desired amount of the desired effect, or the success in achieving a given goal.  Contrary to the term efficiency, the focus of efficacy is the achievement as such, not the resources spent in achieving the desired effect. Therefore, what is effective is not necessarily efficacious, and what is efficacious is not necessarily efficient.

Other synonyms for effectiveness include:  clout, capability, success, weight, performance.
Antonyms for effectiveness include:  uselessness, ineffectiveness.

Simply stated, effective means achieving an effect, and efficient means getting a task or job done it with little waste. To illustrate: suppose, you build 10 houses, very fast and cheap (efficient), but no one buy them. In contrary to building 5 houses same budget and time as 10 houses but you get all 5 sold and the buyers are happy (effective). You get the desired result selling your houses and happy customers (effect).

See also

 Effect (disambiguation)

References

Heat transfer
Goal